Football at the Osandok Prize Sports Games is an association football competition held for professional teams in the Multi-sport events - Osandok Prize Sports Games in North Korea. It is held and overseen by the DPR Korea Football Association and was founded in 2015. Osandok is a dong in hoeryeong

Results

Performance by club

References 

The Chosun Jørn: Can Jørn Andersen Make Sense of North Korean Football?